Robert Cire (March 5, 1924 – April 10, 2009) was a football head coach and educator. He was born in Donaldsonville, Louisiana and raised in Greenville, Mississippi before he served in the U.S. Army Air Corps from 1943 to 1946 during World War II. After his service, he earned a degree from Delta State College (now Delta State University) and a master's degree in education from Columbia University in 1950. After he graduated, Cire served as a teacher at the City University of New York before taking a position at Livingston.

He served as the head coach at Livingston State College (now the University of West Alabama) from 1957 through the 1959 season and compiled an overall record of two wins, 22 losses and one tie during his tenure there (2–22–1). By 1970 he had become an educator and tennis coach at Cambridge-South Dorchester High School and retired in 1986.

Head coaching record

References

1924 births
2009 deaths
West Alabama Tigers football coaches
City University of New York faculty
Delta State University alumni
Teachers College, Columbia University alumni
United States Army personnel of World War II
United States Army Air Forces soldiers
People from Donaldsonville, Louisiana
People from Cambridge, Maryland